Charmois-l'Orgueilleux is a commune in the Vosges department in Grand Est in northeastern France.

Geography
The Côney forms the commune's south-eastern border.

See also
Communes of the Vosges department

References

External links

Official site

Communes of Vosges (department)